The 1982–83 Biathlon World Cup was a multi-race tournament over a season of biathlon, organised by the UIPMB (Union Internationale de Pentathlon Moderne et Biathlon). The season started on 27 January 1983 in Ruhpolding, West Germany, and ended on 11 March 1983 in Holmenkollen, Norway. It was the sixth season of the Biathlon World Cup, and the first in which women were allowed to compete in their own European Cup. Though called the European Cup, participation was not restricted to Europeans.

The second World Cup round was originally going to be held in Oberhof, East Germany, but they had to cancel due to a lack of snow. The races were therefore moved to Antholz-Anterselva, Italy.

Originally the first round of the European Cup was to be held in Jáchymov, Czechoslovakia from 21 to 24 January 1983, but it was cancelled, thus the races in Lappeenranta, Finland were the only ones held.

Men's calendar
Below is the World Cup calendar for the 1982–83 season.

*The relays were technically unofficial races as they did not count towards anything in the World Cup.

Women's calendar

*The relays were technically unofficial races as they did not count towards anything in the World Cup.

World Cup Podium

Men

Women

Standings: Men

Overall 

Final standings after 10 races.

Standings: Women

Overall 

Final standings after 2 races.

Achievements
First World/European Cup career victory
, 23, in his 4th season — the WC 1 Individual in Ruhpolding; first podium was 1980–81 Sprint in Ruhpolding
, 23, in his 2nd season — the WC 2 Sprint in Antholz-Anterselva; it also was his first podium
, 19, in her 1st season — the EC 1 Individual in Lappeenranta; it also was her first podium
, in her 1st season — the EC 1 Sprint in Lappeenranta; it also was her first podium
, 20, in his 1st season — the WC 4 Individual in Holmenkollen; first podium was 1982–83 Sprint in Lahti
, 18, in his 1st season — the WC 4 Sprint in Holmenkollen; first podium was 1982–83 Sprint in Antholz-Anterselva

First World/European Cup podium
, 18, in his 1st season — no. 3 in the WC 2 Sprint in Antholz-Anterselva
, in her 1st season — no. 2 in the EC 1 Individual in Lappeenranta
, in her 1st season — no. 3 in the EC 1 Individual in Lappeenranta
, 22, in her 1st season — no. 2 in the EC 1 Sprint in Lappeenranta
, in her 1st season — no. 3 in the EC 1 Sprint in Lappeenranta
, 20, in his 1st season — no. 3 in the WC 3 Sprint in Lahti
, 21, in his 2nd season — no. 2 in the WC 4 Individual in Holmenkollen

Victory in this World/European Cup (all-time number of victories in parentheses)
, 3 (3) first places
, 2 (16) first places
, 2 (5) first places
, 1 (1) first place
, 1 (1) first place
, 1 (1) first place
, 1 (1) first place
, 1 (1) first place

Retirements
Following notable biathletes retired after the 1982–83 season:

Notes
1.  In the individual races here some non-World Cup racers participated. Among those was Holger Wick, he was not a World Cup racer and so did not receive any World Cup points, and for World Cup purposes Vladimir Velichkov and Johann Passler finished 9th and 10th respectively in the 20 km individual and received the appropriate World Cup points.

References

Biathlon World Cup
World Cup